5'-AMP-activated protein kinase subunit beta-2 is an enzyme that in humans is encoded by the PRKAB2 gene.

The protein encoded by this gene is a regulatory subunit of the AMP-activated protein kinase (AMPK). AMPK is a heterotrimer consisting of an alpha catalytic subunit, and non-catalytic beta and gamma subunits. AMPK is an important energy-sensing enzyme that monitors cellular energy status. In response to cellular metabolic stresses, AMPK is activated, and thus phosphorylates and inactivates acetyl-CoA carboxylase (ACC) and beta-hydroxy beta-methylglutaryl-CoA reductase (HMGCR), key enzymes involved in regulating de novo biosynthesis of fatty acid and cholesterol. This subunit may be a positive regulator of AMPK activity. It is highly expressed in skeletal muscle and thus may have tissue-specific roles.

Related gene problems
1q21.1 deletion syndrome
1q21.1 duplication syndrome

Interactions
PRKAB2 has been shown to interact with PRKAG2 and PRKAG1.

Research on the genes CHD1L and PRKAB2 within lymphoblast cells lead to the conclusion that anomalies appear with the 1q21.1 deletion syndrome: 
 CHD1L is an enzyme which is involved in untangling the chromatids and the DNA repair system. With 1q21.1 deletion syndrome a disturbance occurs, which leads to increased DNA breaks. The role of CHD1L is similar to that of helicase with the Werner syndrome
 PRKAB2 is involved in maintaining the energy level of cells. With 1q21.1-deletion syndrome this function was attenuated.

References

Further reading

EC 2.7.11